The Prince Mohammad bin Fahd Stadium is a multi-purpose stadium in Dammam, Saudi Arabia.  It was built in 1973 and named after Muhammad bin Fahd, former governor of the Eastern Province, and was the first football stadium in the province.

It is used mostly for football matches and is the home stadium of the local clubs, Al-Ettifaq and Al-Nahda.

The stadium's capacity is 26,000 people, and has an area of 105929.06 square meters.

References

External links
 
Stadium profile - Soccerway
Official stadium profile

Sport in Dammam
Sports venues completed in 1973 
Football venues in Saudi Arabia 
Multi-purpose stadiums in Saudi Arabia